The 2012 South East Asian Table Tennis Championships were held in Vientiane, Laos from 10 to 14 December 2012.

Medal summary

Medal table

Events

See also
Asian Table Tennis Union
Asian Table Tennis Championships

References

South East Asian Table Tennis Championships
South East Asian Table Tennis Championships
South East Asian Table Tennis Championships
Table Tennis Championships
Table tennis in Laos
International sports competitions hosted by Laos
South East Asian Table Tennis Championships